In 2010 Halmstads BK competed in the Allsvenskan and Svenska Cupen in Swedish football. They finished 12th in the league table out of 14 teams and reached the 3rd round of the cup.

Squad

First-team squad

Youth squad
Youth squad players that can be called up to the main squad.

Transfers

In

Out

Appearances and goals

Overall statistic
Updated 4 October 2010

|}

Matches

Pre-Season/Friendly

Allsvenskan

Svenska cupen

Competitions

Allsvenskan

Standings

Results summary

Results by round

Season statistics

Pre-season 

= Number of bookings
8px= Number of sending offs after a second yellow card
= Number of sending offs by a direct red card

Allsvenskan 

= Number of bookings
8px= Number of sending offs after a second yellow card
= Number of sending offs by a direct red card

Svenska cupen 

= Number of bookings
8px= Number of sending offs after a second yellow card
= Number of sending offs by a direct red card

Overall 
Only league and cup matches

= Number of bookings
8px= Number of sending offs after a second yellow card
= Number of sending offs by a direct red card

International players
Does only contain players that represent the senior squad during the 2010 season.

Friendly

Youth

U 21

Senior
Notes
Jónas Guðni Sævarsson was called up to Icelands national team against both Cyprus and Portugal, he spent both matches on the substitution bench.

References

External links
 Halmstads BK homepage
 SvFF homepage

Halmstads BK seasons
Halmstad
Halmstad